The 2019 UCI World Tour was a series of races that included thirty-eight road cycling events throughout the 2019 men's cycling season. It was the first time since the World Tour was launched by the Union Cycliste Internationale (UCI) in 2009 that it was not a ranking competition in its own right. The tour started with the opening stage of the Tour Down Under on 15 January and concluded with the final stage of the Tour of Guangxi on 22 October.

Events
The 2019 calendar was initially announced in June 2018, with the Abu Dhabi Tour being replaced with the UAE Tour, following its merger with the Dubai Tour. In September 2018, the Three Days of Bruges–De Panne was promoted to World Tour level, having been a 1.HC-categorised race in 2018. In November 2018, the Presidential Cycling Tour of Turkey was announced to be moving back to April, after the two most recent editions were held in October.

References

External links

 
2019
2019 in men's road cycling